During the 2005–06 English football season, Leeds United A.F.C. competed in the Football League Championship, their second consecutive season at this level.

Season summary
With new players brought in over the summer, the club's goal during the 2005–06 season was promotion. Blackwell's shrewd tactics away from Elland Road and attacking style at home proved highly effective, and by the end of February, Leeds were third in the Championship. However, from that point onwards Leeds slumped, gaining just 4 points from a possible 18, and eventually had to settle for a play-off place. In the first round of the play-offs, against Preston North End, Leeds drew 1–1 at Elland Road, but won the return leg 2–0 to advance to the final, played on 21 May at the Millennium Stadium in Cardiff. However, in a dismal performance, Leeds crashed to a 3–0 defeat to Watford. While some fans predicted that Leeds would go one better and finally return to the Premier League the following year, others were concerned by the fact that, with the exception of the bottom four teams, Leeds's form going into the play-offs was the worst of any team in the Championship, their only two wins in the final months of the campaign being the play-off victory against Preston and a narrow 1–0 victory against relegated Crewe Alexandra.

Final league table

Results
Leeds United's score comes first

Legend

Football League Championship

Championship play-offs

FA Cup

League Cup

First-team squad
Squad at end of season

Left club during season

Reserve squad

References

Leeds United
Leeds United F.C. seasons
Foot